Celico is a town and comune in the province of Cosenza in the Calabria region of southern Italy.

People
Joachim of Fiore (c.1135 – 1202),  mystic, theologian and esoterist 
 Gioachino Greco (c. 1600 – c. 1634) (chess master and writer)

Cities and towns in Calabria